Vampire Hunter D: Bloodlust (吸血鬼ハンターD ブラッドラスト Banpaia Hantā Dī: Buraddorasuto) is a 2000 dark fantasy vampire adventure anime film produced by Madhouse, Filmlink International, BMG Japan, Movic, Good Hill Vision, and Soft Capital. It was written, directed and storyboarded by Yoshiaki Kawajiri, with Yutaka Minowa designing the characters, Yūji Ikehata serving as art director and designing the setting, and Marco D'Ambrosio composing the music. The film is based on the third novel of Hideyuki Kikuchi's Vampire Hunter D series, Demon Deathchase.

The film began production in 1997 and was completed with the intention of being shown in American theaters. It was shown in twelve theaters across the United States and received generally positive reception from American critics.

Plot

In the middle of the night, Charlotte Elbourne, a young woman, is abducted by Baron Meier Link, a vampire nobleman. Several days later, Charlotte's wealthy father, John, hires D, a dhampir, to rescue her, dead or alive.

At the same time, Charlotte's older brother Adam hires the Marcus Brothers, composed of their leader Borgoff, the hulking Nolt, the blade master Kyle, the frail/physically bedridden psychic Grove, and Leila, a woman who holds a grudge towards vampires. D and the Marcus Brothers race after Meier, learning that Charlotte was not kidnapped but chose to accompany him out of love for the vampire.

Meier hires the mutant Barbarois to guard him, consisting of the shapeshifter Caroline, the shadow manipulator Benge, and the werewolf Machira. Nolt is killed by Benge, resulting in the brothers confronting the Barbarois in their home territory. At the same time, D visits them. Grove causes a large ruckus using his psychic powers, and D becomes trapped in a void that Benge creates. D escapes the void, and the Marcus Brothers avenge Nolt by killing Benge. They then travel to a nearby town, where Leila convinces the local sheriff to stop D. Fortunately, D is saved by an old man who recalls the dhampir rescuing him as a child.

Meier's carriage stops to rest during the daytime, and Charlotte wanders out, meeting D and Leila. The two fight against Caroline while Machira escapes with the carriage. D defeats Caroline but is forced to seek shelter after absorbing too much sunlight. Leila faces a revived Caroline and survives only by chance when lightning strikes the mutant, killing her instantly. She takes shelter with D after and reveals that a vampire back in her childhood kidnapped her mother. This resulted in her being stoned to death by the people of her hometown when she returned as a completely different person and killed her father. Leila joined the Marcus Brothers to avenge her parents' deaths. The two make a pact to visit each other's graves upon who dies first.

The Marcus Brothers trap Meier's carriage on a bridge by bombing it and carjacking Charlotte. However, their trap is foiled by Machira's enhanced senses, resulting in Kyle being killed and Borgoff falling off the bridge but surviving, losing an eye. Meier and Charlotte reach the Castle of Chaythe, where Countess Carmilla Elizabeth Bathory awaits them. Meanwhile, Machira stays behind to fight D, but the vampire hunter slays him.

It is then revealed that Meier and Charlotte had reached out to the Countess, hoping they could fly to the City of the Night, a vampire refuge located in space. However, Carmilla betrays the couple, temporarily slaying Meier and tricking Charlotte into being bitten. Revived by Charlotte's blood, she uses hallucinations to haunt D, Borgoff, and Leila. D is unaffected and saves Leila from her hallucinations depicting her tragic childhood, but Borgoff is tricked and turned. Grove reappears and saves Leila by blowing up the now vampiric Borgoff with an embrace. Grove then dies as a result. D confronts Carmilla and is able to destroy her spirit whilst a reawakened Meier destroys her physical body. D and Meier then clash for a final time, with D gaining the upper hand. During the fight, Charlotte dies from her wounds, with her ring tossed to D and Meier by Leila. D ultimately spares Meier's life and leaves the castle with Leila while taking Charlotte's ring as proof for her father and brother. As Meier uses the castle's ship to depart to the City of the Night, D and Leila look on, with Leila wishing the vampire success.

Years later, a funeral is held for Leila, with a large crowd attending. Among the crowd is Leila's granddaughter, who recognizes D from a distance and invites him to spend time with her family, but he kindly refuses. D reveals he is glad Leila was wrong about nobody being at her funeral and leaves contentedly.

Cast
{| class="wikitable"
|-
! Character !! English Voice Actor !! Japanese Voice Actor
|-
! D
| Andy Philpot|| Hideyuki Tanaka 
|-
! Meier Link
| John Rafter Lee|| Kōichi Yamadera
|-
! Leila
| Pamela Segall|| Megumi HayashibaraAkiko Yajima |- 
! Charlotte Elbourne
| Wendee Lee|| Emi Shinohara
|-
! D's Left Hand
| Mike McShane|| Ichirō Nagai
|-
! Carmilla
| Julia Fletcher || Bibari Maeda
|-
! Borgoff Marcus
| Matt McKenzie|| Yūsaku Yara
|-
! Nolt Marcus
| John DiMaggio|| Ryūzaburō Ōtomo
|-
! Kyle Marcus
| Alex Fernandez|| Houchu Ohtsuka
|-
! Grove Marcus
| Jack Fletcher|| Seki Toshihiko
|-
! Polk
| John Hostetter|| Takeshi Aono
|-
! Sheriff
| John DiMaggio || Rikiya Koyama
|-
! Benge
| Dwight Schultz || Keiji Fujiwara
|-
! Caroline
| Mary Elizabeth McGlynn || Yōko Sōmi
|-
! Machira
| rowspan="2"| John DiMaggio || Rintarou Nishi
|-
! John Elbourne
|Motomu Kiyokawa
|-
! Alan Elbourne
| rowspan="2"| John DeMita || Koji Tsujitani
|-
! Priest
| Unshō Ishizuka
|-
! Leila's Granddaughter
| Debi Derryberry || Mika Kanai
|-
! Old Man of Barbarois
| Dwight Schultz|| Chikao Ōtsuka
|-
! D's Mother
| Julia Fletcher|| Chiharu Suzuka
|}

Production

The idea for a new Vampire Hunter D film came after there was a fan demand to make a follow-up to Vampire Hunter D (1985). Hideyuki Kikuchi was also in favor of this as he had often complained about the "cheapness" in the look of the original film. Plans for a new film started in 1997 by director Yoshiaki Kawajiri and production company Madhouse. Producer Mataichirō Yamamoto wanted to pick up the rights to Madhouse's Wicked City. During the discussion about Wicked City, Yamamoto heard about the new Vampire Hunter D film and wanted to not only get involved with video distribution, but in production and possible theatrical release in America.

The story of Vampire Hunter D: Bloodlust is based on the third novel in Kikuchi's series D - Demon Deathchase. The main character's design is by artist Yoshitaka Amano. Amano's art style was matched for the rest of the characters in the film by animation director Yutaka Minowa. The animation for the film was created in the Madhouse Studios in Tokyo while the post-production work was done in California. The English soundtrack for the film was recorded in 1999 before the Japanese dialogue was finished. The film's title of Vampire Hunter D: Bloodlust was a last-minute decision to distinguish it from the first film.

Release

Theatrical
To promote the film, a two-and-a-half-minute-long trailer was finished in 1998 and was shown at American anime fan conventions. A work-in-progress print was shown in 2000 at the Fantasia Film Festival in July in Montreal and at the New York Anime Film Festival in October 2000.

The completed version of the film was only released theatrically in an English-language version. On its Japanese theatrical release, it was subtitled in Japanese. It premiered on September 23, 2001, in America where it played in six theaters. It grossed $25,521 in this run and $151,086 in total, making it the highest-grossing Japanese film ever in a language other than Japanese.

Home video
Urban Vision released the movie on DVD and VHS on February 12, 2002, and it was listed at #7 on the Billboard Top DVD Sales chart for the week of March 9, 2002. Then on February 3, 2015, Discotek Media announced their license to release the movie for Blu-ray on September 8, 2015, and DVD on September 22, 2015, however, due to licensing restrictions, all  releases have the original English audio only.

In Japan, the film was released on DVD on December 19, 2001, by Avex Entertainment with both English and Japanese audio.

Reception
The film received generally favorable reviews from American critics. The review aggregator Rotten Tomatoes reported that 72% of critics have given the film a positive review based on 32 reviews, with an average rating of 6.4/10. The site's critics consensus reads, "Vampire Hunter Ds gothic charms may be lost on those unfamiliar with the anime series that spawned it, but the crisp action and nightmarish style will satiate horror aficionados' bloodlust." It received a rating of 62 on the website Metacritic based on 15 critic reviews, indicating "generally favorable reviews". The Chicago Reader gave a favorable review of the film, referring to it as a "gorgeously animated surrealist adventure". The New York Daily News referred to the film as "Beautiful, witty and provocative" and that it should "appeal to fans and non-fans alike". The San Francisco Chronicle praised the director Yoshiaki Kawajiri stating that he "has a gift for striking visuals" but also noted that "his story manages to be simultaneously thin and chaotic."

 See also 
Japanese films of 2000
List of anime theatrically released in the United States
List of horror films of 2000

Notes

References

External linksVampire Hunter D: Bloodlust'' at Metacritic

2000 anime films
2000 films
2000 horror films
2000 fantasy films
2000s monster movies
2000 science fiction films
Animated post-apocalyptic films
Dark fantasy anime and manga
Discotek Media
Dracula films
Fiction set in the 7th millennium or beyond
Films about kidnapping
Films based on Japanese novels
Films directed by Yoshiaki Kawajiri
Films set in castles
Hong Kong supernatural horror films
Japanese action horror films
Japanese animated horror films
Japanese animated science fiction films
Japanese supernatural horror films
Madhouse (company)
Post-apocalyptic anime and manga
Bloodlust
Vampires in animated film
Vampires in anime and manga
Werewolves in animated film
2000s English-language films
2000s Hong Kong films